Catfield is a village and civil parish in the English county of Norfolk.

History
Catfield's name is of both Anglo-Saxon and Viking origin, deriving from an amalgamation of the Old English and Old Norse for Kati's open land.

In the Domesday Book, Catfield is described as a settlement of 31 households in the hundred. The village was divided between the estates of Alan of Brittany and Roger Bigod.

Geography
In the 2011 Census, Catfield is recorded as having a population of 943 residents living in 451 households.

For the purposes of local government, the parish falls within the district of North Norfolk.

Catfield falls within the constituency of North Norfolk and is represented at Parliament by Duncan Baker MP of the Conservative Party.

All Saints' Church
Catfield's Parish Church is of Norman origin and holds an intricate Medieval arcade depicting several saintly kings. The church is a Grade I listed building.

Notable Residents
Harry Cox- farmworker and folk-singer

War Memorial
Catfield's War Memorial is located in All Saints' Churchyard and lists the following names for the First World War:
 Lieutenant Francis H. Harrison (1886-1916), 3rd Battalion, Yorkshire Regiment
 Able-Seaman Walter E. Neave (d.1917), HMS Recruit
 Able-Seaman John W. Newman (1895-1917), HMS Torrent
 Sergeant Fred George (d.1915), 1st Battalion, Worcestershire Regiment
 Private Frank C. Myhill (1884-1917), Royal Army Medical Corps
 Private Reginald Pert (1895-1916), 1st Battalion, East Surrey Regiment
 Private Albert J. Twiddy (1888-1918), King's (Liverpool) Regiment
 Private Walter C. Blaxell (1889-1918), 2nd Battalion, Royal Norfolk Regiment
 Lieutenant Edward Addy
 Petty-Officer William Newman
 Able-Seaman Cecil Mason
 Sergeant Alex M. Jannet
 Marine Alfred Hudson
 Private Fred Brooks
 Private Walter Brooks
 Private Percy Hall
 Private Fred Myhill
 Private Robert Newman
 Private Harold Thompson
 Private Charles Turner
 Seaman Arthur Clow
 Signalman Jesse Lock

And, the following for the Second World War:
 Private Alfred G. Newman (1919-1944), 5th Battalion, Royal Norfolk Regiment
 Private Arthur Toll

References

External links

Villages in Norfolk
Civil parishes in Norfolk
North Norfolk